Aisin Gioro Miande (11 August 1747 – 17 November 1786) was Yonghuang's eldest son and Qianlong Emperor's grandson.

Life 
Miande was born on 11 August 1747 to lady Ilari, Yonghuang's princess consort. His father died in 1750 and was posthumously honoured as Prince Ding'an of the First Rank. Initially, Miande held a title of the first ranking prince. In 1752, he was demoted to the Prince of the Second Rank.  In 1775, Miande took part in the funeral of Empress Xiaoyichun. In 1777, Miande arrived late at the funeral of Consort Shu and was forbidden from return to capital until the end of the mourning period. The prince was stripped of his title after it was revealed that he rewarded a fifth rank official Qin Xiong with a collection of precious calligraphy paintings. After the investigation led by Fuheng's son Fulong'an, Qin Xiong had been involved in hijacking Miande's horse. The scandal didn't disturb the repromotion to the Duke of the First Rank in the following year. His title was passed younger brother, Mian'en. In 1784, Miande was promoted to the Prince of the Fourth Rank. He died on 17 November 1786 and was succeeded by his son Yichun.His descendants became a minor clansmen in comparison to the descendants of his brother, who inherited the peerage as high-ranking princes.

Family 
Miande was married to Lady Borjigit, eldest daughter of Princess Hejing of the First Rank and leader of Khorchin Mongols Septeng Baljur. In 1766, he married lady Irgen Gioro as a primary consort.

 Primary consort, of the Khorchin Borjigin clan(嫡福晋博尔济吉特氏; d. 1763) 
 Primary consort, of the Irgen Gioro clan ( 1766–1786) 
 Prince of the Fourth Rank Yichun (1767-1816), first son
 Lady of the Second Rank

References 

Qing dynasty imperial princes
Prince Ding
1747 births
1786 deaths